The Great Lakes Pilotage Authority is a Crown corporation of the Government of Canada, which was established as a result of recommendations made by the Royal Commission on Pilotage in Canada, by the Pilotage Act in February 1972. Initially incorporated as a limited company in May 1972, it became an independent Crown corporation in 1998. The corporation is responsible for pilotage through Canadian waters in Manitoba and Ontario, as well as waters in Quebec south of the Saint-Lambert Lock. In international waters (predominantly the Great Lakes and the Saint Lawrence Seaway), pilotage is a shared responsibility between the Great Lakes Pilotage Authority and American pilot associations.

References 

Federal departments and agencies of Canada
Canadian federal Crown corporations
Transport companies established in 1972
Water transport in Ontario
Water transport in Manitoba
Water transport in Quebec
1972 establishments in Ontario